I Am Diego Maradona is a 2015 Iranian film directed by Bahram Tavakoli. The script was written by Tavakoli and lensed by Hooman Behmanesh. Golab Adineh, Saeed Aghakhani, Jamshid Hashempur, Babak Hamidian and Saber Abar starred in the principal roles.

The film was one of the most successful Iranian films of the year and was nominated for multiple awards at the 2015 Fajr Film Festival.

References

External links
 
2015 films
Iranian comedy-drama films